Chandeni Mandan is a village development committee in Kabhrepalanchok District in Bagmati Province of central Nepal. At the time of the 1991 Nepal census it had a population of 3,267 and had 618 houses in it.

References

External links
UN map of the municipalities of Kavrepalanchok District

Populated places in Kavrepalanchok District